The 2015 CAF Champions League group stage was played from 26 June to 12 September 2015. A total of eight teams competed in the group stage to decide the four places in the knockout stage of the 2015 CAF Champions League.

Draw
The draw for the group stage was held on 5 May 2015, 11:00 UTC+2, at the CAF headquarters in Cairo, Egypt. The eight winners of the second round were drawn into two groups of four. Each group contained one team from Pot 1, one team from Pot 2, and two teams from Pot 3. The seeding of each team was determined by their ranking points calculated based on performances in continental club championships for the period 2010–2014.

The following eight teams were entered into the draw:

Format
Each group was played on a home-and-away round-robin basis. The winners and runners-up of each group advanced to the semi-finals.

Tiebreakers
The teams were ranked according to points (3 points for a win, 1 point for a draw, 0 points for a loss). If tied on points, tiebreakers would be applied in the following order:
Number of points obtained in games between the teams concerned;
Goal difference in games between the teams concerned;
Goals scored in games between the teams concerned;
Away goals scored in games between the teams concerned;
If, after applying criteria 1 to 4 to several teams, two teams still have an equal ranking, criteria 1 to 4 are reapplied exclusively to the matches between the two teams in question to determine their final rankings. If this procedure does not lead to a decision, criteria 6 to 9 apply;
Goal difference in all games;
Goals scored in all games;
Away goals scored in all games;
Drawing of lots.

Groups
The matchdays were 26–28 June, 10–12 July, 24–26 July, 7–9 August, 21–23 August, and 11–13 September 2015.

Group A

Group B

References

External links
Orange CAF Champions League 2015, CAFonline.com

2